The Stephen and Mary Bunnell House was at 970 S. 800 West, on the Utah Valley University campus, Orem, Utah was built in 1892.  It was listed on the National Register of Historic Places in 1996.

It was the farmhouse of a  farm with an orchard;  it is now within the college campus.

In 2012 it was torn down to make way for a new building on campus, with plans to rebuild a smaller replica. The replica, also on campus, had been finished by 2015. Before it was torn down, Paul Cheney and the university's Digital Media Department created a virtual tour of the building. See http://virtual.uvu.edu/2012_bunnellHouse/.

References

Georgian architecture in Utah
Houses completed in 1892
Houses on the National Register of Historic Places in Utah
Houses in Orem, Utah
Victorian architecture in Utah
National Register of Historic Places in Orem, Utah
Buildings and structures demolished in 2012
Demolished buildings and structures in Utah